Tim Burke (born May 29, 1955 in Melrose, Massachusetts) is a former ice hockey defenseman and assistant coach in many different leagues.

Career
Tim Burke serves as the director of scouting for the San Jose Sharks.  In this role, he coordinates and oversees the Sharks efforts in the National Hockey League's annual Entry Draft while working closely with Executive Vice President and General Manager Doug Wilson and his staff. In addition to being the principal decision-maker at the draft table, Burke is also responsible for evaluating amateur talent at every level in all North American and European leagues and supervises all aspects of the club's amateur scouting efforts. 
Burke's hard work and keen decision making, coupled with the talents of his competent staff at evaluating players, has produced admired results. Burke's selection process has helped the Sharks create a solid foundation of talented players from which to build the franchise around — including Patrick Marleau (1997), Douglas Murray (1999), Ryane Clowe (2001), Joe Pavelski (2003), Thomas Greiss (2004), Torrey Mitchell (2004), Marc-Edouard Vlasic (2005), Jamie McGinn (2006) Justin Braun (2007) and 2011 Calder Memorial Trophy runner-up Logan Couture (2007), all of whom played prominent roles in the Sharks recent seasons.  
Since the 2003 NHL Draft, no NHL team has produced more games played among their drafted players than the Sharks (3,123) and the Sharks are tied for first in the NHL for average number of homegrown players on the team's roster each season since the 2005-06 (12).
	A member of the Sharks scouting department since the 1992-93 campaign, Burke was promoted to his current position on June 4, 1996. Before his promotion, Burke served as director of professional scouting from 1992–96 and evaluated talent throughout all North American professional leagues and assisted with amateur scouting. 
	From 1987-92, he spent five seasons in the New Jersey Devils organization, serving in several capacities, including as a Devils assistant coach, head coach for the American Hockey League's Utica Devils and as a pro scout. Burke was also an assistant coach at Princeton University from 1984-86. 
	A former defenseman, Burke was selected by the Montreal Canadiens in the seventh round (124th overall) of the 1975 NHL Entry Draft and by the Chicago Cougars in the second round (25th overall) of the 1974 World Hockey Association Entry Draft. He was a four-year letterman in both hockey and baseball at the University of New Hampshire, where he was named to the NCAA's All-America hockey team after his senior campaign.
	He played seven years of professional hockey following his outstanding collegiate career, including three seasons (1977–80) with the Nova Scotia Voyageurs, the Canadiens AHL affiliate, and one season with Jokerit Helsinki in the Finnish Elite League.

See also
List of New Jersey Devils head coaches

Awards and honors

References

External links
 , retrieved on 2007-06-19.

1955 births
AHCA Division I men's ice hockey All-Americans
American ice hockey coaches
American men's ice hockey defensemen
Atlantic Coast Hockey League players
Cape Cod Buccaneers players
Chicago Cougars draft picks
Ice hockey players from Massachusetts
Jokerit players
Living people
Montreal Canadiens draft picks
New Hampshire Wildcats men's ice hockey players
New Jersey Devils coaches
New Jersey Devils scouts
Nova Scotia Voyageurs players
People from Melrose, Massachusetts
San Jose Sharks scouts
Sportspeople from Middlesex County, Massachusetts
Wichita Wind players
Ice hockey coaches from Massachusetts